Pseudolechriops is a genus of Central American weevils alternatively placed in the subfamily Conoderinae or Baridinae. Established by the English entomologist George Charles Champion in 1906, the genus contained only one species, P. megacephala, until several related species were described in 2005.

Species 
Pseudolechriops alleni Hespenheide & LaPierre, 2005
Pseudolechriops coleyae Hespenheide & LaPierre, 2005
Pseudolechriops davidsonae Hespenheide & LaPierre, 2005
Pseudolechriops dimorpha Hespenheide & LaPierre, 2005
Pseudolechriops howdenorum Hespenheide & LaPierre, 2005
Pseudolechriops janeae Hespenheide & LaPierre, 2005
Pseudolechriops klopferi Hespenheide & LaPierre, 2005
Pseudolechriops longinoi Hespenheide & LaPierre, 2005
Pseudolechriops megacephala Champion, 1906
Pseudolechriops wrightae Hespenheide & LaPierre, 2005

References 

Baridinae genera